Moa Lundgren (born 14 April 1998) is a Swedish cross-country skier who represents the club IFK Umeå. The 2022–2023 season saw her winning the Scandinavian Cup.

Cross-country skiing results
All results are sourced from the International Ski Federation (FIS).

World Cup

Season standings

Team podiums
 1 podium – (1 )

References

External links 

1998 births
Living people
Swedish female cross-country skiers
Cross-country skiers at the 2016 Winter Youth Olympics
Youth Olympic gold medalists for Sweden
Sportspeople from Umeå
21st-century Swedish women